Pseudophilautus sarasinorum is a species of frog in the family Rhacophoridae.
It is endemic to Sri Lanka.

Its natural habitats are subtropical or tropical moist montane forests and rivers.
It is threatened by habitat loss.

References

sarasinorum
Frogs of Sri Lanka
Endemic fauna of Sri Lanka
Taxonomy articles created by Polbot